António Augusto Carvalho Monteiro (1848 – 1920), also known as Monteiro dos Milhões (Monteiro the Millionaire), was a Brazilian-Portuguese businessman, collector, bibliophile, entomologist and Freemason.

Born to Portuguese parents in Rio de Janeiro, António inherited a huge family fortune, which he enlarged in Brazil by selling coffee and precious stones, which soon made it possible for him to leave for Portugal.  He received a degree in Law from the University of Coimbra, and was a well-known collector and bibliophile, with a superb collection of the works of Camões.  His cultural interests certainly influenced and guided the mysterious symbols and iconography of the palace that he had built on his estate nestled in the mountains of Sintra, the Palácio da Regaleira.

Carvalho Monteiro was represented in the press of his time as both an altruist and an eccentric, exemplified by his famous Leroy 01, "the most complicated clock in the world."

Tomb 

Carvalho Monteiro had the same architect who built the Palácio da Regaleira, Luigi Manini, build his tomb in the Prazeres Cemetery. The door of the tomb, also encrusted with symbolism, was opened with the same key that opened the Palácio da Regaleira and his palace in Lisbon, on the Rua do Alecrim. As visitors enter the cemetery grove, they encounter the tomb on the left, with the orientation, size, and shape of a Masonic temple, oriented towards the east. It is covered in various symbols. The door knocker is engraved with a bee carrying a skull. The bee, which is diligent and hard-working, represents the Mason in his organized work. The gradeamento which can be seen in the back of the tomb, is festooned with the symbolic wine and bread, the spirit and the body. There are also decorative owls, symbolizing wisdom, as well as poppies, the symbol of eternal sleep.

External links 
António Augusto de Carvalho Monteiro : um naturalista pioneiro

1848 births
1920 deaths
People from Rio de Janeiro (city)
Brazilian people of Portuguese descent
19th-century Portuguese lawyers
Brazilian entomologists
University of Coimbra alumni
Portuguese bibliophiles